Milan Perendija (born 5 January 1986) is a Serbian former professional footballer who played as a defender.

Club career
Perendija progressed through the youth ranks of Partizan, before spending time out on loan at Teleoptik (2004–2006), Voždovac (2006), and Vardar (2007). He helped the latter club win the Macedonian Cup in the 2006–07 season. Perendija spent one more year with Vardar, before switching to crosstown rivals Rabotnički. He helped them win the Macedonian Cup in the 2008–09 season.

In the summer of 2009, Perendija was transferred to Romanian side Oțelul Galați. He helped the club win the championship in the 2010–11 season for the first time in their history. In the 2013 winter transfer window, Perendija moved to Russia and signed with Mordovia Saransk.

In early 2017, after spending 10 years abroad, Perendija returned to his homeland and signed for SuperLiga side Radnički Niš until the end of the 2016–17 season. He was released by the club after just three months.

In July 2017, Perendija returned to Romania and joined Gaz Metan Mediaș for one year. He parted ways with the club by mutual consent two months later. In early 2018, Perendija was acquired by Serbian SuperLiga side Rad.

International career
Perendija represented Serbia and Montenegro at the 2005 UEFA European Under-19 Championship.

Honours
Vardar
 Macedonian Cup: 2006–07
Rabotnički
 Macedonian Cup: 2008–09
Oțelul Galați
 Liga I: 2010–11
 Supercupa României: 2011
Mordovia Saransk
 Russian Football National League: 2013–14

Notes

References

External links

 
 
 
 

ASC Oțelul Galați players
Association football defenders
CS Gaz Metan Mediaș players
Expatriate footballers in North Macedonia
Expatriate footballers in Romania
Expatriate footballers in Russia
FC Mordovia Saransk players
FK Partizan players
FK Rabotnički players
FK Rad players
FK Radnički Niš players
FK Teleoptik players
FK Vardar players
FK Voždovac players
Footballers from Belgrade
Liga I players
Russian Premier League players
Serbian expatriate footballers
Serbian expatriate sportspeople in North Macedonia
Serbian expatriate sportspeople in Romania
Serbian expatriate sportspeople in Russia
Serbian footballers
Serbian SuperLiga players
1986 births
Living people